Ban Klang is a tambon (subdistrict) of San Pa Tong District, in Chiang Mai Province, Thailand. In 2014 it had a population of 9,676 people.

Administration

Central administration
The tambon is divided into 11 administrative villages (muban).

Local administration
The area of the subdistrict is shared by two local governments:
 The subdistrict municipality (thesaban tambon) Ban Klang (เทศบาลตำบลบ้านกลาง)
 The subdistrict administrative organization (SAO) Wiang Tha Kan (องค์การบริหารส่วนตำบลเวียงท่ากาน)

References

External links
Thaitambon.com on Ban Klang

Tambon of Chiang Mai province
Populated places in Chiang Mai province